Tibicina is a genus of cicadas  belonging to the family Cicadidae, subfamily Tibicininae.

Species
Species within this genus include:
Tibicina cisticola (Hagen, 1855)
Tibicina contentei (Boulard, 1982)
Tibicina corsica (Rambur, 1840)
Tibicina fairmairei Boulard, 1984
Tibicina garricola Boulard, 1983
Tibicina haematodes (Scopoli, 1763)
Tibicina longisyllaba Hertach, 2021 
Tibicina luctuosa (A. Costa, 1883)
Tibicina nigronervosa Fieber, 1876
Tibicina picta (Fabricius, 1794)
Tibicina quadrisignata (Hagen, 1855)
Tibicina steveni (Krynicki, 1837)
Tibicina tomentosa (Olivier, 1790)

References

Tibicinini
Cicadidae genera